Brian McCowage (20 May 1935 – 4 March 1994) was an Australian fencer. He competed at the 1956, 1960 and 1964 Summer Olympics.

References

External links
 

1935 births
1994 deaths
Australian male fencers
Olympic fencers of Australia
Fencers at the 1956 Summer Olympics
Fencers at the 1960 Summer Olympics
Fencers at the 1964 Summer Olympics
Sportspeople from Sydney
Commonwealth Games medallists in fencing
Commonwealth Games silver medallists for Australia
Fencers at the 1958 British Empire and Commonwealth Games
Fencers at the 1962 British Empire and Commonwealth Games
Fencers at the 1966 British Empire and Commonwealth Games
20th-century Australian people
Medallists at the 1958 British Empire and Commonwealth Games
Medallists at the 1962 British Empire and Commonwealth Games
Medallists at the 1966 British Empire and Commonwealth Games